Bad Debt is a studio album by American musician Hiss Golden Messenger. It was released in November 2010 under Black Maps Records, then reissued in January 2014 under Paradise of Bachelors with three new tracks.

Track listing

References

2010 albums
Hiss Golden Messenger albums